Kim Ji-hoon (born May 9, 1981) is a South Korean actor. He is best known for his romantic comedies on television such as The Golden Age of Daughters-in-Law (2007), Love Marriage (also known as Matchmaker's Lover, 2008), Stars Falling from the Sky (also known as Wish Upon a Star, 2010), and My Cute Guys (2012). In 2010, he also appeared in the film Natalie, and cable mystery series Unsolved.

Filmography

Television series

Film

Variety show

Music video

Theater

Awards and nominations

References

External links
 Kim Ji-hoon at Big Picture Entertainment
 
 

1981 births
South Korean male film actors
South Korean male television actors
South Korean male stage actors
Ajou University alumni
Living people
21st-century South Korean male actors
South Korean Buddhists